Anle District is a district of the city of Keelung, Taiwan.

History
In March 1988, the Keelung city government reassigned administration of several urban villages between districts. Sih-wha, Sih-rong, Sih-ding, Sih-kong, Deh-ho, Deh-ann, and Chung-ho, originally part of Anle District, became part of Zhongshan District (Chung-shan). Ying-geh, Chi-sien, She-wei, San-min, Wu-fu and Liu-ho, originally part of Qidu District (Chi-du) became part of Anle District.

Geography

 Area: 18.025 km2
 Population: 80,521 (February 2023)

Administrative divisions
Anle District includes 25 urban villages: Siwei/Sihwei, Qixian/Cisian, Jiaren, Yongkang, Gancheng, Xinxi/Sinsi, Xichuan/Sichuan, Dingguo, Dingbang, Leyi, Anhe, Ciren/Cihren, Xinlun/Sinlun, Neiliao, Zhonglun/Jhonglun, Wulun, Wailiao, Xingliao/Singliao, Changle, Wufu, Liuhe/Liouhe, Sanmin, Ying'an/Ying-an, Yingge, Zhuangguan.

Formerly: Anguo, Baoding, Daitiansfu, Dawulun, Gangkou, Guanyin, Maijin, Qingrenhu, Siding, Sincheng, Sinhuei, Sinlun, Wuling, Yinggeshi.

Tourist attractions

 Dawulun Fort
 Xinshan Reservoir
 Au-de Fishing Port
 Lovers Lake
 Shi-fang-da-jyue Temple

Notable natives
 Lu Shiow-yen, Mayor of Taichung

See also
 Keelung

References

External links

  
 活力新基隆 第二集安樂區 ('Lively New Keelung Episode Two Anle District') 

Districts of Keelung